Our Very Own is a 1950 American drama film directed by David Miller. The screenplay by F. Hugh Herbert focuses on a teenage girl who learns she was adopted as an infant. Ann Blyth, Farley Granger, and Jane Wyatt star in the film.

Plot
Los Angeles teenager Gail Macaulay is going steady with deliveryman Chuck, a relationship that sparks jealousy in her younger sister Joan. When Joan needs her birth certificate in order to obtain summer employment, her mother Lois tells her to look in a box in her dresser, where the girl discovers Gail's adoption papers.

That evening, at Gail's 18th birthday party, Joan flirts with Chuck, and when her angry sister confronts her, Joan reveals the truth about her background. The following morning, Lois tells Gail her biological father was killed in an accident before she was born, but her mother, Gert Lynch, is alive. Gail persuades Lois to have their lawyer arrange a meeting with her birth mother, but Lois decides to visit Gert in her Long Beach home first. Gert is thrilled to see photographs of Gail, but is loath to let her second husband Jim know she has a child, so Lois arranges a meeting the following evening, when Jim will be out.

After Gail and her friend Zaza depart for Gert's home, Lois receives a panicked phone call from the woman telling her Jim canceled his plans and is staying home to play cards with friends. Gert waits for the girls outside her house, but before they arrive Jim asks her to prepare refreshments. When Gail enters the house, Gert introduces her as the daughter of an old friend. Gert quietly explains the situation to Gail and apologizes for the mixup.

Gail returns to the car and tells Zaza the reunion went well, then asks if she can spend the night at her house. Chuck, who had arrived at the Macaulay home just before Gail left for the ill-fated reunion with Gert, has spent the worried night with Gail's parents after having the situation explained to him. When Gail fails to return home, Gail's parents begin to worry and Chuck goes to Zaza's house and reproaches Gail for hurting the people who raised her and loved her as their own. This idea of family as "the people who are there for you" is reinforced when Gail learns that Zaza's father will not be attending their high school graduation ceremony, having chosen to attend an out-of-town party instead.

At the graduation ceremony, Gail imbues her senior class Vice President speech about citizenship with a loving message about the true meaning of family, to the delight of her parents, sisters, and Chuck.

Cast
Ann Blyth ..... Gail Macaulay
Farley Granger ..... Chuck
Jane Wyatt ..... Lois Macaulay
Donald Cook ..... Fred Macaulay
Ann Dvorak ..... Gert Lynch
Joan Evans ..... Joan Macaulay
Natalie Wood ..... Penny Macaulay
Phyllis Kirk ..... Zaza
Jessie Grayson ..... Violet
Martin Milner ..... Bert
Ray Teal ..... Jim Lynch

Production
With this film, producer Samuel Goldwyn wanted to return to the simple family values portrayed in the Andy Hardy films MGM had released a decade earlier. Farley Granger thought the script was "pointless and meandering", but as a Goldwyn contract player, he faced suspension if he refused to make the film. He thought director David Miller was "a perfectly nice man", but "no help to anybody". Granger later went to Paris and then London, where he rang up a substantial bill at the Savoy Hotel. When Goldwyn implored him to return to the States to help promote the film, Granger agreed to give The Times an interview and then fly to New York City to appear at the premiere there if the studio settled his hotel bill, and Goldwyn reluctantly agreed.

Jane Wyatt, on loan from 20th Century Fox, was disappointed to find herself cast as an advice-dispensing mother after having played a succession of sophisticated roles opposite Gary Cooper, Cary Grant, and Gregory Peck. She had little regard for the role until a few years later, when she was cast in the successful television series Father Knows Best as a direct result of her performance in Our Very Own.

Critical reception
Bosley Crowther of The New York Times observed, "What is there so disturbing about the knowledge of being an adopted child? This picture doesn't tell you. All that it arbitrarily does is assume that the knowledge would be upsetting and then proceeds from there — proceeds to tug at the heartstrings with close-ups and weeping violins and Ann Dvorak sniffling profusely as a regretful woman who abandoned her infant child. And then, after this has been worked over for a sufficiently heartrending while, the picture hops back to teen-age clowning and a belief that all's right with the world. No, thank you, Mr. Goldwyn. There is more to the problem than this. Adoption deserves clarification with something better than farcical laughs and corny sobs."

Awards and nominations
The film was nominated for the Oscar for Best Sound (Gordon E. Sawyer), but lost to All About Eve.

Comic book adaption
 Eastern Color Movie Love #5 (October 1950)

References

External links

1950 films
1950 drama films
American drama films
American black-and-white films
1950s English-language films
Films scored by Victor Young
Films about adoption
Films set in Los Angeles
Samuel Goldwyn Productions films
Films adapted into comics
Films directed by David Miller
1950s American films